Dr William Charles Osman Hill FRSE FZS FLS FRAI (13 July 1901 – 25 January 1975) was a British anatomist, primatologist, and a leading authority on primate anatomy during the 20th century.  He is best known for his nearly completed eight-volume series, Primates: Comparative Anatomy and Taxonomy, which covered all living and extinct primates known at the time in full detail and contained illustrations created by his wife, Yvonne.  Schooled at King Edward VI Camp Hill School for Boys in Birmingham and University of Birmingham, he went on to publish 248 works and accumulated a vast collection of primate specimens that are now stored at the Royal College of Surgeons of England.

Early life and education
William Charles Osman Hill was born on 13 July 1901 the son of James Osman Hill and his wife Fanny Martin.

He was educated first at King Edward VI Camp Hill School for Boys in Birmingham, and later obtained his degrees from the University of Birmingham. During medical school, also at the University of Birmingham, he won three junior student prizes and the Ingleby Scholarship in Midwifery. He obtained his primary medical degrees in 1924, and the same year took on the role of lecturer in zoology. Osman Hill earned his MD with honours in 1925. He also earned his Ch. B while in medical school.

Career
Upon graduation, Osman Hill continued his role as a lecturer at the University of Birmingham under an apprenticeship until 1930, but teaching anatomy instead of zoology.  In 1930, his career took shape when he moved to Sri Lanka, then known as Ceylon, to become both Chair of Anatomy and Professor of Anatomy at the Ceylon Medical College (more recently named Faculty of Medicine of the University of Colombo or Colombo Medical School). His position allowed him to pursue anthropological studies of the indigenous Veddah people and comparative anatomy of primates.  During this time, he began developing a private menagerie of exotic and native species.  Consisting mostly of a variety of primates and parrots, the collection reported included several types of cockatoo (family Cacatuidae), red-fan parrots (Deroptyus accipitrinus), eclectus parrots (Eclectus roratus), star tortoises (genus Geochelone), leopard tortoises (Stigmochelys pardalis), Galápagos tortoises (Chelonoidis nigra), and ruddy mongooses (Herpestes smithii). Osman Hill held this position in Ceylon for 14 years, returning to the UK after being appointed as Reader in Anthropology at the University of Edinburgh in 1945. Upon his departure from Ceylon, his menagerie was divided between the London Zoo and the National Zoological Gardens of Sri Lanka.

Five years later in 1950, he became prosector for the Zoological Society of London and remained there for twelve years. When he left the London Zoo in 1962, the old prosectorium that has been his office was closed, many preserved biological specimens were discarded, and the era of anatomists working at the London Zoo—starting from the time of Richard Owen—came to a close. Between 1957 and 1958, Osman Hill also acted as a visiting scholar at Emory University in Atlanta, Georgia. Later in 1958, primatologist Jane Goodall studied primate behaviour under him in preparation for her studies of wild chimpanzees. In 1962, he was hired as the assistant director of the Yerkes National Primate Research Center (YNPRC) in Atlanta after being turned down for the position of director.

The Royal Society of Edinburgh honoured him as a fellow in 1955 and for his contributions to science awarded him both its Gold Medal and the Macdougal-Brisbane Prize.  Upon his retiring from YNPRC in 1969, the Royal College of Surgeons of England made him a Hunterian Trustee.  Following retirement, Osman Hill divided his time between his home at Folkestone and his continued work at the University of Turin.  His relentless work in anatomy ended only during the final stages of his terminal illness, after he had suffered three years of increased illness as well as diabetes.

Publications
During his career, Osman Hill wrote 248 publications, all academic journal articles or chapters in books based primarily upon his own observations. His first paper, which discussed the comparative anatomy of the pancreas, was published in 1926.  In all, his works, which continued being published until the year of his death, focused on the anatomy and behaviour of humans, primates, and other mammals.

Osman Hill is best known for writing Primates: Comparative Anatomy and Taxonomy, an eight-volume series that aimed to include all living and extinct primates.  Published by Edinburgh University between 1953 and 1974, the series was the culmination of 50 years of his scientific research and thought.  Each volume, starting with the strepsirrhines, covered its subjects exhaustively, including native and scientific nomenclature, anatomical structure, genetics, behaviour and palaeontology. The books were illustrated with both photographs and drawings, most of which were made by his wife, Yvonne.  The series was known for its breadth and depth, however it was never completed.  Projected as a nine-volume set, Osman Hill died in 1975, leaving his magnum opus unfinished. With five sections of the final volume written, including material on the taxonomy and most of the anatomy of langurs, it was hoped that his widow would be able to follow through with plans to prepare and publish them. However, she died one year later.

This monographic series often received praise for its encyclopaedic content, but was also criticised for occasional omissions, errors, and lack of specificity.

Selected publications
The eight volumes for which Osman Hill is best remembered were
Primates Comparative Anatomy and Taxonomy (1953–1974)
 
 
 
 
 
 
 
 

The following is a list of other selected publications written by Osman Hill between 1926 and 1974.

Legacy

Osman Hill is remembered as a "distinguished anatomist", "eminent primatologist", and the foremost authority on primate anatomy of his time. However, he did not consider himself a primatologist, but instead related best to old-school anatomists and naturalists, who studied the entire biological world and considered their own observations and recordings as sufficient.  To these ends, he used his curiosity and broad knowledge of natural history.

Osman Hill was remembered for his skill at dissection, and was noted for his ability to make quick, but accurate sketches of the anatomical features his scalpel revealed. He is also remembered for his work as a "painstaking investigator", physician, and anthropologist. In his honour, two species have been named after him: Osman Hill's mangabey (Lophocebus osmani ) and the Colombo wolf snake (Lycodon osmanhilli ).  The Primate Society of Great Britain named their Osman Hill Medal award after him. The award is given every two years for distinguished contributions to primatology.

He is responsible for describing one subspecies of black-and-white ruffed lemur (Varecia variegata), the southern black-and-white ruffed lemur (V. v. editorum) in 1952; one subspecies of toque macaque (Macaca sinica), the highland toque macaque (M. s. opisthomelas) in 1942; one subspecies of red slender loris (Loris tardigradus), the Horton Plains slender loris (L. t. nycticeboides) in 1942; and two subspecies of grey slender loris (Loris lydekkerianus), the highland slender loris (L. l. grandis) in 1932 and the dry zone slender loris (L. l. nordicus) in 1933.

His extensive collection of biological primate specimens, which included tissues and skeletons, is preserved at the Royal College of Surgeons of England.

Personal life

Osman Hill married his wife, Yvonne Stranger, a barrister, in 1947. Yvonne, the only daughter of Harold Stranger KC, MP, was not only his devoted wife, but also a collaborator and illustrator of his works. The couple preferred a small, close-knit circle of friends, and the dinners they hosted for their friends included the best wines and exotic dishes, such as python stew.  Yvonne died close to a year after her husband.

Osman Hill was described in a memorial published in the International Journal of Primatology (1981) as being "short and rotund, with twinkling blue eyes, a quiet manner, and a strong sense of humor."  He was particularly remembered for his eagerness to help young researchers. In the Journal of Medical Primatology he was described as an "entertaining companion with a quick and ready wit." In another memorial, published in the Journal of Anatomy in 1975, he was described as friendly and tolerant, as well as "a merry man, vigorous, of humane culture, having the humour and good sense natural to those bred in the Provinces: a good Englishman."  He was known to value simple citizenship and academics, and held small regard for people who "aspired to monarchy."  At Yerkes in Atlanta, some staff members viewed him as "the archetypical English scholar-gentleman who viewed those from the 'colonies' as a step below the British."

In the British Who's Who, Osman Hill named field ornithology, botany, photography, and travel as his recreations. Other casual interests included drugstore ice cream, good eating, old buildings, and gardening with his wife.

References

1901 births
1975 deaths
Primatologists
British anatomists
British anthropologists
Cryptozoologists
People educated at King Edward's School, Birmingham
Alumni of the University of Birmingham
20th-century British zoologists
20th-century anthropologists
British expatriate academics in Sri Lanka